Korzha is a rural locality (a village) in Prigorodnoye Rural Settlement, Sokolsky District, Vologda Oblast, Russia. The population was 10 as of 2002.

Geography 
Korzha is located 16 km southeast of Sokol (the district's administrative centre) by road. Veretye is the nearest rural locality.

References 

Rural localities in Sokolsky District, Vologda Oblast